The Washington Winch sits in the forests of eastern Victoria near Swifts Creek and is also known as the Washington Iron Works Skidder.

Its rusting relics are close to Bentley Plain and the Moscow Villa hut which was built in 1942 by firetower man Thomas William Ah Chow.

It was a steam-powered logging skidder, or cable winch. It was one of two machines imported to Western Australia in the 1920s and was initially used by the Karri Timber Company to move the large jarrah logs. It burnt wood as fuel.

Both winches were sold to the Forests Commission Victoria for salvaging timber in the Central Highland on the Toorongo Plateau near Noojee after the 1939 Black Friday fires. The machines were able to move large logs up to 800 m by high-lead cables in the wet and steep terrain. They were also capable of lifting logs off the ground, over rocks and creeks back to a central landing.

The machine near Swifts creek was later sold and moved to its present site by local sawmilling company Ezards in 1959 where it operated until 1960-61.  A large logging camp supported men operating the machine. The fate of the second machine is unknown.

The advent of more powerful bulldozers, crawler tractors, haulage trucks and petrol chainsaws dramatically changed logging practices after WW2. It then became feasible for machines to harvest logs and for trucks to haul them directly from the forest to town-based sawmills within a few hours. The new diesel and petrol technology eventually made steam power and the Washington Winch redundant.

The winch remains a unique part of Victoria's cultural heritage and logging history; left intact with engine, spars and cabling still rigged for work it is the only steam-powered engine of its kind in Australia. It is listed on the Victorian Heritage Register, and is managed and protected by local staff at Swifts Creek employed by the Department of Environment, Land, Water and Planning (DELWP).

A roof was put over the winch to protect it from the elements, the original spars had rotted and were replaced with messmate poles and new cables were restrung in about 1999.

Washington Iron Works
Washington Iron Works was a company in Seattle, Washington, founded by John M. Frink, that built these steam skidders. The company was active from 1882 until the 1980s when its various divisions – manufacturing cranes, logging equipment, and presses – were gradually sold off. The Works closed in 1986.

Washington Iron Works engines revolutionised steam logging in the 1920s and 1930s. The steam-powered winches were mounted on heavy log skid frames which allowed the winch to be transported to new sites. Many Washington skidders can still be seen in North America.

Operation
The Washington Winch operated either a high lead or a skyline system.

The high lead system was not often used as it only partially lifted the logs off the ground, which caused the logs to become caught in rocks, and left behind a "snig track", which deepened over time.

The skyline system involved two large spars (trees) used to create a "flying fox" to lift logs over the rough ground.

Riggers climbed 60 m up a large tree and headed the trunk, which would cause the tree to sway violently. They then secured the spar with guy cables and attached the tackle. This operation was dangerous and physically demanding, often taking a full day, with lunch sent up on a rope.

The Washington Winch was used to harvest Alpine Ash logs which was then sawn to produce high-value products such as furniture, flooring and architraves at Ezards mill at Swifts Creek.

Gallery

References

Information panel at site

External links

McHugh, Peter. (2020). Forests and Bushfire History of Victoria : A compilation of short stories, Victoria.  https://nla.gov.au/nla.obj-2899074696/view

FCRPA - Forests Commission Retired Personnel Association (Peter McHugh) - https://victoriasforestryheritage.org.au

 Slackline Rigging
 North Bend Rigging
 High lead Rigging

Logging in the United States
Forestry equipment
Forestry in Australia
Forestry in the United States
Logging in Australia
Victorian Heritage Register
Shire of East Gippsland